Charrlotte De'Davis (born March 1988) is a British businesswoman, philanthropist and humanitarian best known for the work of her female-focused charitable Foundation.

Background and career 

Charrlotte De'Davis grew up in Berkshire. In 2007, she moved to the City of London to commence her Undergraduate degree.

At the age of 22, she set up her own Events company and partnered with FashionTV, MTV and the members-only lifestyle community ASmallWorld.

In 2015, she launched BARDOU BEAUTY, a lifestyle and beauty brand aimed at women's empowerment.

Philanthropy 

De’Davis supports the economic empowerment, protection and social justice of exploited, disadvantaged and vulnerable girls and women internationally. An advocate of the #MeToo movement, she launched the charitable initiative, The BARDOU Foundation in October 2017, a few days before the #MeToo movement reached widespread international coverage. The Foundation partnered with Charles, Prince of Wales's charitable initiative, The Prince's Trust. The launch event was held on 11 October to raise awareness of the United Nations, International Day of the Girl Child. Award-winning actor Idris Elba hosted the gala and honoured British designer, Anya Hindmarch an award for being an inspiration to young women through her success as a businesswoman and mother. The BARDOU Foundation funded The Prince's Trust, 'Get Started Programme' for socially and economically disadvantaged girls entering into the beauty industry. In 2018, The Foundation hosted an event by Spice Girl, Geri Horner at the members-only club in Mayfair, London, Annabel's.

De'Davis also works with The United Nations Entity for Gender Equality and the Empowerment of Women (UN Women).

References 

1988 births
Living people
21st-century English businesswomen
21st-century English businesspeople
English philanthropists
English women philanthropists
English company founders
British women company founders
People from Berkshire